Dimitrios Grontis (born 24 August 1994) is a Greek professional footballer who plays as a midfielder for Gamma Ethniki club Panionios.

Career
Grontis began his career at the infrastructure segments of AEK Athens, signing a professional contract with the club in 2012. On 25 August, he made his professional debut against Asteras Tripoli, playing for 81 minutes. Ηe followed the club throughout its decline and its relegation to the Third Division, as well as its rebirth, staying until January 2016, having made a total of 45 appearances for the club.

On 20 January 2016, Grontis moved to fellow Super League side Atromitos, signing a 2,5-year contract. However, in January 2017, his contract was terminated by mutual consent. Three days after his release from Atromitos, Grontis joined Iraklis. On 25 January 2017, he scored his first goal in a crucial 2–0 away win against Veria. His excellent performances helped his team avoid relegation, as Iraklis finished the season with 4 wins in its last 5 games. However, in light of the team's insurmountable financial problems, he was forced to leave the club. 

In July 2017, Grontis joined Super League side AEL on a 3-year contract. He was however immediately loaned out to Football League Trikala, and left AEL in the summer of 2018, signing a contract with second-tier club Aittitos Spata. After the first half of the 2018–19 season, Grontis moved to another second-tier club Ergotelis on a free transfer in January 2019.

Honours
AEK Athens
Football League: 2014–15 (South Group)
Football League 2: 2013–14 (6th Group)

References

External links
Soccerway.com Profile
Onsports.gr Profile
 https://web.archive.org/web/20120827002602/http://www.aekfc.gr/index.asp?a_id=2824&pl=202

1994 births
Living people
Greek footballers
Greece under-21 international footballers
Greece youth international footballers
Greek expatriate footballers
Super League Greece players
Football League (Greece) players
AEK Athens F.C. players
Atromitos F.C. players
Iraklis Thessaloniki F.C. players
Trikala F.C. players
Ergotelis F.C. players

Association football midfielders
Footballers from Central Greece
People from Boeotia